Thomas Rattray (1684–1743) was a Scottish Episcopal bishop who served as the Primus of the Scottish Episcopal Church from 1738 to 1743.

He was chosen as Bishop of Brechin by the clergy of that diocese, in opposition to John Ochterlony who was the choice of the college of bishops. He was consecrated in Edinburgh on 4 June 1727 by Primus Millar and bishops Gadderar and Cant, but the college of bishops contended that Rattray's consecration had been irregular and uncanonical. The matter was not resolved until he was appointed Bishop of Dunkeld in 1731. He was also elected the Primus in July 1738.

He died in office on 12 May 1743, aged 59.

References

  

1684 births
1743 deaths
Bishops of Brechin (Episcopalian)
Bishops of Dunkeld (Episcopal Church of Scotland)
18th-century Scottish Episcopalian bishops
Primuses of the Scottish Episcopal Church